The 1959 Penn Quakers football team was an American football team that represented the University of Pennsylvania during the 1959 NCAA University Division football season. Penn was named champion of the Ivy League. 

In their sixth and final year under head coach Steve Sebo, the Quakers compiled a 7–1–1 record and outscored opponents 195 to 74. Barney Berlinger was the team captain.

Penn's 6–1 conference record was the best in the Ivy League, earning the conference championship. The Quakers outscored their Ivy opponents 147 to 52.

Penn played its home games at Franklin Field adjacent to the university's campus in Philadelphia, Pennsylvania.

Schedule

References

Penn
Penn Quakers football seasons
Ivy League football champion seasons
Penn Quakers football